Blue Stars is a Dutch basketball club based in Diemen, North Holland. The club played in the top tier Eredivisie during the 60s, 70s and 80s.

History 
Blue Stars Basketball was founded in 1947 by Jan Janbroers and is one of the oldest basketball clubs in the Netherlands. The men's team was in 1960 one of the founders of the Premier League and has won several national titles and national cups. Between 1970 and 1973, Blue Stars sponsored by Fiat and they were called temporarily "Fiat Stars". Hereafter called the team between 1973 and 1976 "Gerard Long Blue Stars". After the termination of this sponsorship agreement, the Blue Stars stopped in the premier league.

Doing since the fifties Blue Stars along at the top of the women's league. With twenty championships Blue Stars, the club with the most league titles in the history of the Dutch women's basketball. In the seventies, the Blue Stars ladies formed the basis of the Dutch team.

Today 
At present Blue Stars has no more teams at the highest level. In 2007, they had only 27 members and stood Blue Stars for choosing whether or not to proceed with the association. Blue Stars has then taken by a number of enthusiasts, the decision to go ahead and blow new life into the club. From that moment on Blue Stars started again with a youth section. Blue Stars Men 1 and 2 are in the Rayon. Other teams from the region classes of Amsterdam region. Blue Stars has in the 2013-2014 season more than 130 members.

Honours 

(Men)

Dutch League
 Winners (2): 1958-59, 1969–70
Dutch Cup
 Winners (1): 1972-73

(Women)

Dutch League
 Winners (20): 1950-51, 1951–52, 1952–53, 1953–54, 1954–55, 1955–56, 1956–57, 1957–58, 1958–59, 1961–62, 1962–63, 1963–64, 1965–66, 1968–69, 1970–71, 1971–72, 1972–73, 1973–74, 1974–75, 1975-76
Dutch Cup
 Winners (15): 1950-51, 1953–54, 1954–55, 1955–56, 1956–57, 1957–58, 1962–63, 1967–68, 1968–69, 1970–71, 1971–72, 1972–73, 1973–74, 1974–75, 1975–76

Notable players 
  Jan Willem Jansen
  Ton Boot

External links 
 Official website

Basketball teams in the Netherlands
Basketball teams established in 1947
1947 establishments in the Netherlands
Diemen
Sport in North Holland